(The Deadly Wishes), Op. 27, is an  opera by Giselher Klebe who also wrote the libretto based on La Peau de chagrin by Honoré de Balzac. It consists of fifteen lyrical scenes in three acts. It premiered on 14 June 1959 at the Deutsche Oper am Rhein in Düsseldorf, conducted by Reinhard Peters, and was published by Boosey & Hawkes. The opera was revived in 2006 at the Landestheater Detmold on the occasion of the composer's 80th birthday.

History 
Giselher Klebe focused on literary opera, writing his own librettos based on classical literature. His first opera, premiered in 1959 was Die Räuber, after the play by Friedrich Schiller. Klebe based  on Honoré de Balzac's La Peau de chagrin. He structured it in fifteen lyrical scenes in three acts.

The opera premiered on 14 June 1959 at the Deutsche Oper am Rhein in Düsseldorf, conducted by Reinhard Peters. The leading roles were performed by Walter Beißner (tenor) as Raphael von Valentin, Ingrid Paller (soprano) as Pauline, and Kurt Gester (baritone) in five roles intended to be performed by one singer, Der Groupier, Der Alte, Der Besitzer des Kuriositätenladens, Der Notar Cardot and Jonathan, Raphaels Diener. The performance was part of the Woche "Musiktheater des 20. Jahrhunderts" (week of music theatre of the 20th century), and was staged by Günter Roth. Klebe dedicated the opera to my beloved wife Lore. It was published by Boosey & Hawkes.

The opera was revived in 2006 at the Landestheater Detmold, where the composer then lived and taught at the Musikhochschule and was an honorary citizen. On the occasion of his 80th birthday, the Landestheater Detmold staged the work, directed by Kristina Wuss and conducted by Erich Wächter. The premiere on 23 February 2006 was accompanied by an exposition of his autographs kept by the Lippische Landesbibliothek.

References

External links 
 Die tödlichen Wünsche, Bibliothèque nationale de France, Catalogue général
 Die tödlichen Wünsche, German National Library
 Die tödlichen Wünsche Operone
 Hans-Klaus Jungheinrich: Verdi als Wegweiser. Die Aktualität Giselher Klebes takte-online.de

German-language operas
Adaptations of works by Honoré de Balzac
Operas by Giselher Klebe
Operas
1959 operas
Operas based on novels
Music dedicated to family or friends